Alviar "The Machine" Lima (born 23 March 1978) is a retired Cape Verdean-Dutch middleweight kickboxer who fought out of Rotterdam, Netherlands. He made his K-1 debut against Warren Stevelmans in K-1 MAX Netherlands 2008 The Final Qualification.

Career
Lima has fought in various events and tournaments around Europe such as Beast of the East, It's Showtime Trophy, KlasH, SuperLeague, and Ring Masters. In SuperLeague, he reached his peak with clutching the title where he had beaten respectively José Reis, Ali Gunyar, and Kamal El Amrani in 2005. He also has some remarkable victory records over Imro Main and Vasily Shish in Klash Event.

He has been invited to K-1 after his knock-out victory over Nieky Holzken, which also was selected as one of the best KOs of the year by Fight Club, the martial arts magazine of multi-sports channel Eurosport.

On 24 May 2013, Lima fought his retirement fight against Romanian prospect Alexandru Irimia. Coach Dennis Krauweel cried when Lima announced once again his retirement. He was awarded for his win by his Team SuperPro colleague, Rico Verhoeven.

Miscellaneous
Former K-1 World Max champion Albert Kraus and It's Showtime Reality Show contender Swede fighter Elias Daniel were some of his sparring mates.

His name is also written as Aalviar Lima instead.

Titles
 2010 Beast of the East tournament runner up -72.5 kg
 2009 Beast of the East tournament runner up -72.5 kg
 2008 WFCA Muaythai World champion -76 kg
 2008 WFCA Thaiboxing Middleweight world champion -72.57 kg
 2007 IKBA Thaiboxing World champion
 2006 SuperLeague Middleweight title -73 kg
 2006 It's Showtime 75MAX Trophy Belgium Pool A winner -75 kg
 2005 IKBA Thaiboxing World champion -73 kg
 2005 SuperLeague Middleweight Tournament champion -73 kg

Kickboxing record

|-  bgcolor="#CCFFCC" 
| 2013-05-24 || Win ||align=left| Alexandru Irimia || KlasH Champions Challenge: Drumul către Glorie! Bătălia de pe Bega || Timișoara, Romania || Decision (Split) || 3 || 3:00 
|-
! style=background:white colspan=9 |
|-
|-  bgcolor="#FFBBBB"
| 2011-11-19 || Loss ||align=left| Tevfik Sucu || SuperKombat World Grand Prix Final 2011 || Darmstadt, Germany || Decision (Unanimous) || 3 || 3:00 
|-  bgcolor="#CCFFCC"
| 2011-05-29 || Win ||align=left| Lindo Profas || The Battle of the Rotterdam Rebels 9 || Rotterdam, Netherlands || Decision (Unanimous) || 3 || 3:00
|-  bgcolor="#CCFFCC"
| 2010-06-12 || Win ||align=left| Lukasz Rambalski || Beast of the East 2010 Poland || Gdynia, Poland || Decision (Unanimous) || 3 || 3:00
|-  bgcolor="#FFBBBB"
| 2010-03-07 || Loss ||align=left| Warren Stevelmans || Time For Action presents: Team SuperPro 10 Year Anniversary || Nijmegen, Netherlands || Decision (Unanimous) || 3 || 3:00
|-
! style=background:white colspan=9 |
|-
|-  bgcolor="#FFBBBB"
| 2010-01-30 || Loss ||align=left| Shemsi Beqiri || Beast of the East 2010 tournament final || Zutphen, Netherlands || Decision (Unanimous) || 3 || 3:00
|-
! style=background:white colspan=9 |
|-
|-  bgcolor="#CCFFCC"
| 2010-01-30 || Win ||align=left| Tevfik Sucu || Beast of the East 2010 tournament semi final || Zutphen, Netherlands || Decision (Unanimous) || 3 || 3:00
|-  bgcolor="#CCFFCC"
| 2010-01-30 || Win ||align=left| Lukasz Rambalski || Beast of the East 2010 tournament quarter final || Zutphen, Netherlands || KO || 2 ||
|-  bgcolor="#c5d2ea"
| 2009-12-19 || Draw ||align=left| Muhammed Gür || Mix Fight || Darmstadt, Germany || Decision draw || 5 || 3:00 
|-  bgcolor="#CCFFCC"
| 2009-10-31 || Win ||align=left| Fadi Merza || KlasH European Elimination || Martigny, Switzerland || Decision (Unanimous)|| 5 || 3:00
|-  bgcolor="#FFBBBB"
| 2009-04-21 || Loss ||align=left| Artur Kyshenko || K-1 World MAX 2009 Final 16 || Fukuoka, Japan || TKO (Referee stoppage) || 1 || 2:56 
|-  bgcolor="#FFBBBB"
| 2009-01-24 || Loss ||align=left| Khalid Bourdif || Beast of the East 2009 || Venice, Italy || Ext R. Decision (Unanimous) || 4 || 3:00 
|-
! style=background:white colspan=9 |
|-
|-  bgcolor="#CCFFCC"
| 2009-01-24 || Win ||align=left| William Diender || Beast of the East 2009 || Zutphen, Netherlands || Decision (Unanimous) || 3 || 3:00 
|-  bgcolor="#CCFFCC"
| 2009-01-24 || Win ||align=left| Szűcs Barnabás || Beast of the East 2009 || Zutphen, Netherlands || Decision (Unanimous) || 3 || 3:00
|-  bgcolor="#FFBBBB"
| 2008-10-05 || Loss ||align=left| Goran Borovic || Tough Is Not Enough || Rotterdam, Netherlands || 2 Ext R. Decision (Unanimous) || 5 || 3:00
|-
! style=background:white colspan=9 |
|-
|-  bgcolor="#CCFFCC"
| 2008-07-07 || Win ||align=left| Mark Vogel || K-1 World MAX 2008 Final 8 || Fukuoka, Japan || TKO (Doctor stoppage) || 2 || 3:00 
|-  bgcolor="#CCFFCC"
| 2008-05-31 || Win ||align=left| Yücel Fidan || Beast of the East || Zutphen, Netherlands || TKO (Doctor stoppage/Cut) || 2 || 0:59
|-  bgcolor="#FFBBBB"
| 2008-03-15 || Loss ||align=left| Gregory Choplin || It's Showtime 75MAX Trophy 2008, Quarter Finals || 's-Hertogenbosch, Netherlands || Decision (Unanimous) || 3 || 3:00
|-  bgcolor="#FFBBBB"
| 2008-02-17 || Loss ||align=left| Warren Stevelmans || K-1 MAX Netherlands 2008 The Final Qualification || Utrecht, Netherlands || Decision (Split) || 3 || 3:00
|-  bgcolor="#CCFFCC"
| 2008-01-26 || Win ||align=left| Nieky Holzken || Beast of the East || Zutphen, Netherlands || KO (Left hook) || 3 || 0:36
|-
! style=background:white colspan=9 |
|-
|-  bgcolor="#CCFFCC"
| 2007-10-26 || Win ||align=left| Vasily Shish || KlasH Champions Battlefield: Show No Mercy || Sibiu, Romania || Decision (Unanimous) || 3 || 3:00
|-  bgcolor="#CCFFCC"
| 2007-07-21 || Win ||align=left| Mario Princ || KlasH Champions Battlefield II || Albufeira, Portugal || KO || 1 || 
|-  bgcolor="#CCFFCC"
| 2007-04-28 || Win ||align=left| Imro Main || KlasH Champions Battlefield || Höör, Sweden || Decision || 3 || 3:00
|-
|-  bgcolor="#CCFFCC"
| 2007-03-24 || Win ||align=left| Yassin Boudrouz || It's Showtime Trophy 2007 || Lommel, Belgium || TKO (Doctor Stoppage) || 1 || 
|-
! style=background:white colspan=9 |
|-
|-  bgcolor="#CCFFCC"
| 2007-01-13 || Win ||align=left| Laurent Periquet || K-1 Rules Heavyweight Tournament 2007 in Turkey || Istanbul, Turkey || TKO (Referee stoppage) || 2 || 3:00
|-  bgcolor="#CCFFCC"
| 2006-11-12 || Win ||align=left| Marco Pique || 2H2H Pride & Honor Ahoy 2006 || Rotterdam, Netherlands || Decision (Unanimous) || 5 || 3:00
|-  bgcolor="#CCFFCC"
| 2006-10-14 || Win ||align=left| Baker Barakat || || Germany || || || 
|-  bgcolor="#FFBBBB"
| 2006-09-23 || Loss ||align=left| Şahin Yakut || It's Showtime 75MAX Trophy Final 2006, Semi Finals || Rotterdam, Netherlands || Decision (Unanimous) || 3 || 3:00
|-  bgcolor="#CCFFCC"
| 2006-09-23 || Win ||align=left| Najim Ettouhlali || It's Showtime 75MAX Trophy Final 2006, Quarter Finals || Rotterdam, Netherlands || Ext R. Decision (Unanimous) || 4 || 3:00
|-  bgcolor="#FFBBBB"
| 2006-06-03 || Loss ||align=left| Pajonsuk || Gentleman Fight Night 3|| Tilburg, Netherlands || Decision (Unanimous) || 5 || 3:00
|-  bgcolor="#CCFFCC"
| 2006-05-13 || Win ||align=left| Fadi Merza || SuperLeague Elimination 2006 || Vienna, Austria || Decision (Unanimous) || 5 || 3:00
|-
! style=background:white colspan=9 |
|-
|-  bgcolor="#CCFFCC"
| 2006-03-11 || Win ||align=left| José Reis || SuperLeague Apocalypse 2006 || Paris, France || Decision (Unanimous) || 3 || 3:00
|-  bgcolor="#CCFFCC"
| 2006-02-18 || Win ||align=left| Imro Main || It's Showtime 75MAX Trophy Belgium, Pool A Final || Mortsel, Belgium || TKO || 1 || 
|-
! style=background:white colspan=9 |
|-
|-  bgcolor="#CCFFCC"
| 2006-02-18 || Win ||align=left| Jan van Denderen || It's Showtime 75MAX Trophy Belgium, Pool A Semi Finals || Mortsel, Belgium || Decision || 3 || 3:00 
|-
|-  bgcolor="#CCFFCC"
| 2006-01-28 || Win ||align=left| Petr Polak || SuperLeague Hungary 2006 || Budapest, Hungary || Decision (Unanimous) || 3 || 3:00
|-  bgcolor="#CCFFCC"
| 2005-12-18 || Win ||align=left| Richard Fenwick || I.K.B.A. World Championships || Oss, Netherlands || Decision (Unanimous) || 5 || 3:00  
|-
! style=background:white colspan=9 |
|-
|-  bgcolor="#CCFFCC"
| 2005-10-22 || Win ||align=left| Thomas Hladky || SuperLeague Heavy Knockout 2005 || Vienna, Austria || Decision (Unanimous) || 3 || 3:00
|-  bgcolor="#CCFFCC"
| 2005-09-24 || Win ||align=left| Kamal El Amrani || SuperLeague Turkey 2005, Final || Istanbul, Turkey || TKO (Corner Stoppage) || 3 || 
|-
! style=background:white colspan=9 |
|-
|-  bgcolor="#CCFFCC"
| 2005-09-24 || Win ||align=left| Ali Gunyar || SuperLeague Turkey 2005, Semi Finals || Istanbul, Turkey || TKO (Corner Stoppage) || 2 || 
|-  bgcolor="#CCFFCC"
| 2005-09-24 || Win ||align=left| José Reis || SuperLeague Turkey 2005, Quarter Finals || Istanbul, Turkey || Decision || 3 || 3:00
|-  bgcolor="#CCFFCC"
| 2005-05-21 || Win ||align=left| Thomas Hladky || SuperLeague Germany 2005 || Oberhausen, Germany || TKO (Doctor Stop/Cut) || 1 || 
|-  bgcolor="#c5d2ea"
| 2005-03-26 || Draw ||align=left| Andy Souwer || East Side 4 || Amsterdam, Netherlands || Decision draw || 5 || 3:00
|-  bgcolor="#CCFFCC"
| 2004-12-18 || Win ||align=left| Marko Stünkel || SuperLeague Netherlands 2004 || Uden, Netherlands || TKO || 5 || 
|-  bgcolor="#FFBBBB"
| 2004-11-14 || Loss ||align=left| Imro Main || Muay Thai/Mixed Fight Gala, Sporthal Stedenwijk || Almere, Netherlands || Decision (Unanimous) || 5 || 3:00
|-  bgcolor="#CCFFCC"
| 2004-02-22 || Win ||align=left| Marco Pique || 2 Hot 2 Handle || Rotterdam, Netherlands || Decision (Unanimous) || 5 || 3:00
|-  bgcolor="#c5d2ea"
| 2003-11-30 || Draw ||align=left| Gago Drago || Killerdome IV || Amsterdam, Netherlands || Decision draw || 5 || 3:00
|-  bgcolor="#FFBBBB"
| 2003-09-28 || Loss ||align=left| Ondrej Hutnik || Muay Thai Champions League IX || Rotterdam, Netherlands || Decision (Unanimous) || 5 || 3:00
|-  bgcolor="#FFBBBB"
| 2003-05-31 || Loss ||align=left| Marco Pique || Muay Thai Express I || Rotterdam, Netherlands || Decision (Unanimous) || 5 || 3:00
|-
! style=background:white colspan=9 |
|-
|-  bgcolor="#FFBBBB"
| 2003-03-16 || Loss ||align=left| Şahin Yakut || Ahoy Simply The Best VI || Rotterdam, Netherlands || Decision (Unanimous) || 5 || 3:00
|-  bgcolor="#CCFFCC"
| 2002-10-05 || Win ||align=left| Nabil Boukhari || Thaiboxing @ Topsportcentrum  || Rotterdam, Netherlands || TKO (Ref stop/gave up) ||  || 
|-  bgcolor="#FFBBBB"
| 2002-06-08 || Loss ||align=left| Vincent Vielvoye || W.P.K.L. Muay Thai Champions League VII || Rotterdam, Netherlands || TKO (Corner stoppage) || 4 || 
|-
! style=background:white colspan=9 |
|-
|-  bgcolor="#CCFFCC"
| 2002-03-22 || Win ||align=left| Anouar Hanin || Muay Thai Champions League VI || Rotterdam, Netherlands || TKO || 3 || 
|-  bgcolor="#CCFFCC"
| 2002-03-22 || Win ||align=left| Alexei Perdzchik || Muay Thai Champions League VI || Rotterdam, Netherlands || TKO (Corner stoppage) || 2 || 
|-  bgcolor="#CCFFCC"
| 2001-11-04 || Win ||align=left| Chico Swerts|| Muay Thai Champions League V || Rotterdam, Netherlands || Decision (Unanimous) || 5 || 3:00
|-  bgcolor="#CCFFCC"
| 2001-03-03 || Win ||align=left| James Hoever || Muay Thai Champions League IV || Rotterdam, Netherlands || Decision (Unanimous) || 5 || 3:00
|-  bgcolor="#CCFFCC"
| 2000-09-03 || Win ||align=left| Roel Rink || "Veselic meets Dejpitak" || Arnhem, Netherlands || KO || 1 || 
|-  bgcolor="#CCFFCC"
| 1999-02-07 || Win ||align=left| Timmermans || "Matter of Honor" || Rotterdam, Netherlands || TKO (Doctor stop/injury) || 3 || 
|-
| colspan=9 | Legend:

See also 
List of K-1 events
List of male kickboxers
List of It's Showtime events
List of It's Showtime champions

External links
 K-1 Profile
 Super League Profile

References

1978 births
Living people
Cape Verdean male kickboxers
Dutch male kickboxers
Middleweight kickboxers
Cape Verdean Muay Thai practitioners
Dutch Muay Thai practitioners
Dutch sportspeople of Cape Verdean descent
Sportspeople from Rotterdam
SUPERKOMBAT kickboxers